Nahang (also Romanized as Nāhang) is a village in Mehran Rural District, in the Central District of Bandar Lengeh County, Hormozgan Province, Iran. At the 2006 census, its population was 211, in 47 families.

References 

Populated places in Bandar Lengeh County